Long Bay is one of the northernmost suburbs of the North Shore, part of the contiguous Auckland metropolitan area located in New Zealand.

The coastline is occupied by the Long Bay Regional Park, and the shoreline is in Long Bay-Okura Marine Reserve, which opened in 1995. The beach is sandy and swimming is safe. It offers forest walks and scenic cliffs. This beach has low tide water. Smaller beaches to the north, such as Pohutukawa Bay, accessible except at high tide, are among Auckland's most popular naturist spots; Public nudity is technically legal on any New Zealand beach where it is "known to occur".

The Vaughan Homestead is an historic house at the north end of the beach. It is open fortnightly to the public.

History
Long Bay was traditionally known by the name Whakarewatoto by the Ngāti Manuhiri iwi of the North Shore. A small Māori community of Ngāti Kahu lived at Long Bay, which they called Te Oneroa, until the 1850s. The Vaughan family bought 600 hectares and farmed sheep from 1862 until selling their land to the Auckland Regional Council in 1965 to form the park. A gun emplacement was built on the coast north of the park in case to defend against invasion by Japanese forces during the Second World War. Remnants of the emplacement still exist.

Areas of farmland above Long Bay Regional Park were protected from development by an Environment Court ruling in July 2008. There has been significant development of housing as of 2014 under the Auckland Council's Unitary Plan.

Recent Development 
In 2003, Todd Property, an Auckland property developer, purchased 162 acres of land for Long Bay in 2003. In 2014, residential and commercial development rapidly started to take off, due to the Auckland Council's Unitary Plan, and the goal was due to complete in 2022. As of 2021, most of the project has been fully complete.

Demographics

Long Bay had a population of 1,365 at the 2018 New Zealand census, an increase of 1,182 people (645.9%) since the 2013 census, and an increase of 1,218 people (828.6%) since the 2006 census. There were 414 households, comprising 672 males and 693 females, giving a sex ratio of 0.97 males per female. The median age was 35.3 years (compared with 37.4 years nationally), with 282 people (20.7%) aged under 15 years, 282 (20.7%) aged 15 to 29, 687 (50.3%) aged 30 to 64, and 111 (8.1%) aged 65 or older.

Ethnicities were 48.1% European/Pākehā, 2.2% Māori, 1.1% Pacific peoples, 49.5% Asian, and 3.3% other ethnicities. People may identify with more than one ethnicity.

The percentage of people born overseas was 64.6, compared with 27.1% nationally.

Although some people chose not to answer the census's question about religious affiliation, 57.1% had no religion, 33.2% were Christian, 1.5% were Hindu, 0.7% were Muslim, 1.8% were Buddhist and 1.8% had other religions.

Of those at least 15 years old, 411 (38.0%) people had a bachelor's or higher degree, and 84 (7.8%) people had no formal qualifications. The median income was $38,700, compared with $31,800 nationally. 303 people (28.0%) earned over $70,000 compared to 17.2% nationally. The employment status of those at least 15 was that 546 (50.4%) people were employed full-time, 186 (17.2%) were part-time, and 30 (2.8%) were unemployed.

Education
Long Bay College is a secondary (years 9 - 13) school with a roll of  students. The college celebrated its 25th jubilee in 2000. Long Bay School is a contributing primary (years 1 - 6) school with a roll of  students. Both schools are coeducational.

References

External links

 Long Bay Regional Park
 Long Bay College
 Long Bay School
 Photographs of Long Bay held in Auckland Libraries' heritage collections.

Suburbs of Auckland
Bays of the Auckland Region
East Coast Bays